Bhojpuri Channel is a TV Channel owned by the Mauritius Broadcasting Corporation, launched in January 2013 . It broadcasts programs in Bhojpuri language including Cookery Shows, Pre-recorded radio show, Bhojpuri telefilms and more for the Mauritian Population.

List Of Programs

Local Programs 
Bol Bandhu
Kheti Baari
Khel Khabar
Tu Tu Mei Mei (Bhojpuri local serial)
Anjoria
Chatkar Pakwan
Show from Hamar TV
Kahan Jaat Ba Hamni Ke Samaaj
Naari Shakti
Camere Ke Nazar Se
Tohar Sehat
Bhojpuri Dhamaka
Bhojpuri Hits - Countdown Show
Gulmohar Ki Chaoun Mein
Ao Chala Gaon Ghume
Bhojpuri Clips
Hum Mawjawan 
Apan Adhikar
Tohar Khatir 
 Guzra Zamana
 Hamare Nagrik
 Kala

Currently broadcasting fictional Shows 
Dulhin Uhe Jo Nanad Man Bhave
 Agle Janam Mohe Bitiya Hi Kijo
Badki Malkain
Ee Hai Annapoorna
Kajri
Sajanwa Bairi Hi Gaile Hamar
Hamare Gaow Hamare Desh

Formerly broadcast fictional shows 
Junior G

See also
 Kids Channel (Mauritian TV channel)
 MBC 1 (Mauritian TV channel)
 MBC 2 (Mauritian TV channel)

References 
 "Education is the platform that bring Mauritius and Bihar closer", ^ Defimedia.info
 "Launch of MBC Bhojpuri Channel", ^ Times Mauritius Times
 "Mauritius bhojpuri channel import CDs from Bihar". ^ Bihar Spider

Mauritius Broadcasting Corporation
Television channels in Mauritius